Maigo Peak is a rocky hill situated  east-southeast of Cape Hinode and just west of the Bōhyō Heights on the coast of Queen Maud Land, Antarctica. It was mapped from surveys and air photos by the Japanese Antarctic Research Expedition (JARE), 1957–62; the name "Maigo-yama" (straychild mountain) was applied by JARE Headquarters in 1973.

References

External links

Mountains of Queen Maud Land
Prince Olav Coast